Torbjørn Kallevåg (born 21 August 1993) is a Norwegian professional footballer who plays for Aalesund, as a midfielder.

Career
On 28 May 2020 Kallevåg signed a contract with Lillestrøm.

In December 2022 it was announced he would return to Hødd for the 2023 season.

Career statistics

References

1993 births
Living people
People from Bømlo
Norwegian footballers
Bremnes IL players
SK Vard Haugesund players
IL Hødd players
FK Haugesund players
Norwegian First Division players
Eliteserien players
Association football midfielders
Lillestrøm SK players
Aalesunds FK players
Sportspeople from Vestland